Anthropology of religion is the study of religion in relation to other social institutions, and the comparison of religious beliefs and practices across cultures.

History
Al-Biruni (973–1048), wrote detailed comparative studies on the anthropology of religions and cultures across the Mediterranean Basin (including the so-called  "Middle East") and the Indian subcontinent. He discussed the peoples, customs, and religions of the Indian subcontinent.

In the 19th century cultural anthropology was dominated by an interest in cultural evolution; most anthropologists assumed a simple distinction between "primitive" and "modern" religion and tried to provide accounts of how the former evolved into the latter. In the 20th century most anthropologists rejected this approach.  Today the anthropology of religion reflects the influence of, or an engagement with, such theorists as Karl Marx (1818-1883), Sigmund Freud (1856-1939), Émile Durkheim (1858-1917), and Max Weber (1864-1920). Anthropologists of religion are especially concerned with how religious beliefs and practices may reflect political or economic forces; or the social functions of religious beliefs and practices.

In 1912 Émile Durkheim, building on the work of Feuerbach, considered religion "a projection of the social values of society", "a means of making symbolic statements about society", "a symbolic language that makes statements about the social order"; in short, "religion is society worshiping itself".

Anthropologists circa 1940 assumed that religion was in complete continuity with magical thinking,
and that it is a cultural product. The complete continuity between magic and religion has been a postulate of modern anthropology at least since early 1930s. The perspective of modern anthropology towards religion is the projection idea, a methodological approach which assumes that every religion is created by the human community that worships it, that "creative activity ascribed to God is projected from man". In 1841, Ludwig Feuerbach was the first to employ this concept as the basis for a systematic critique of religion. A prominent precursor in the formulation of this projection principle was Giambattista Vico (1668-1744), and an early formulation of it appears in the ancient Greek writer Xenophanes  570 –  475 BCE), who observed that "the gods of Ethiopians were inevitably black with flat noses while those of the Thracians were blond with blue eyes."

Definition of religion 

One major problem in the anthropology of religion is the definition of religion itself. At one time anthropologists believed that certain religious practices and beliefs were more or less universal to all cultures at some point in their development, such as a belief in spirits or ghosts, the use of magic as a means of controlling the supernatural, the use of divination as a means of discovering occult knowledge, and the performance of rituals such as prayer and sacrifice as a means of influencing the outcome of various events through a supernatural agency, sometimes taking the form of shamanism or ancestor worship. According to Clifford Geertz, religion is

Today, religious anthropologists debate, and reject, the cross-cultural validity of these categories (often viewing them as examples of European primitivism).  Anthropologists have considered various criteria for defining religion – such as a belief in the supernatural or the reliance on ritual – but few claim that these criteria are universally valid.

Anthony F. C. Wallace proposes four categories of religion, each subsequent category subsuming the previous. These are, however, synthetic categories and do not necessarily encompass all religions.

 Individualistic: most basic; simplest. Example: vision quest.
 Shamanistic: part-time religious practitioner, uses religion to heal, to divine, usually on the behalf of a client. The Tillamook have four categories of shaman. Examples of shamans: spiritualists, faith healers, palm readers. Religious authority acquired through one's own means.
 Communal: elaborate set of beliefs and practices; group of people arranged in clans by lineage, age group, or some religious societies; people take on roles based on knowledge, and ancestral worship.
 Ecclesiastical: dominant in agricultural societies and states; are centrally organized and hierarchical in structure, paralleling the organization of states. Typically deprecates competing individualistic and shamanistic cults.

Specific religious practices and beliefs

 Apotheosis
 Apotropaic magic
 Amulet
 Animism
 Circumcision
 Cult (religious practice)
 Deity
 Demon
 Divination
 Esotericism
 Exorcism
 Evil
 Fertility rite
 Fetishism
 Genius (mythology)
 God
 Ghost
 Greco-Roman mysteries
 Heresy
 Icon
 Immortality
 Intercession
 Kachina
 Magic and religion
 Mana
 Mask
 Miracle
 Medicine
 Modern paganism
 Monotheism
 Mother goddess
 Mythology
 Necromancy
 New Age
 Occult
 Omen
 Poles in mythology
 Polytheism
 Prayer
 Principle of contagion
 Prophecy
 Reincarnation
 Religious ecstasy
 Ritual
 Sacred food as offering
 Sacrifice
 Shamanism
 Spell (paranormal)
 Supernatural
 Supplication
 Sympathetic magic
 Theism
 Totemism
 Veneration of the dead
 Western esotericism

See also 

 Anthropological Perspectives on Religion
 Archaeology of religion and ritual
 Cognitive science of religion
 Evolutionary origin of religions
 Magic and religion
 Psychology of religion
 Religious symbolism
 Rite of passage
 Sacred–profane dichotomy
 Sociology of religion
 Symbolic anthropology

Notes

References

Citations

Sources

External links
 Homepage of The Society for the Anthropology of Religion within American Anthropological Association
Anthropology of Religion Page  M.D. Murphy, University of Alabama
 Andrew Lang, Anthropology and Religion, The Making of Religion, (Chapter II), Longmans, Green, and C°, London, New York and Bombay, 1900, pp. 39–64.

 
Religious studies